The Douglas Miners were a short–lived minor league baseball team based in Douglas, Arizona in 1915. The Miners briefly played in the 1915 season as members of the Class D level Rio Grande Association, before folding during the season. The Miners played home minor league games at 10th Street Park.

History
The 1915 Las Cruces Farmers became charter members of the six–team Class D level Rio Grande Association. The league started the season with the Albuquerque Dukes, El Paso Mackmen, Las Cruces Farmers, Phoenix Senators and Tucson Old Pueblos joining Douglas as charter member franchises.

After beginning league play on April 27, 1915, the Miners folded on May 24, 1915. The Douglas and Las Cruces Farmers teams were both dropped from the league on May 24, 1915, due to financial difficulties. The teams' records were 5–13 and 5–14 respectively. 

Douglas compiled their 5–13 record while playing under manager Bill Quigley.

The league continued play with four teams, but folded before the end of the 1915 season. The Rio Grande Association permanently folded on July 5, 1915, with the Phoenix Senators in 1st place.

Douglas, Arizona was without a minor league baseball franchise until 1948. Douglas partnered with neighboring Bisbee, Arizona to form the Bisbee-Douglas Miners of the 1948 Arizona-Texas League.

The ballpark
The Douglas Miners played 1915 minor league home games at 10th Street Park. Today, the park is still in  use as a public park, located at 700 10th Street.

Year–by–year records

Notable alumni
Bill McGilvray (1915)

See also
Douglas Miners players

References

External links
Baseball Reference

Defunct baseball teams in Arizona
Baseball teams disestablished in 1915
Baseball teams established in 1915
Douglas, Arizona
Defunct Rio Grande Association teams